Sar-El (lit. The National Project for Volunteers for Israel or Service for Israel), is a non-profit service organization, subordinate and under the direction of the Israeli Logistics Corps, for Israeli citizens living abroad, and who now wish to finalize their status with the military. The program is also open to non-Israeli citizens who wish to participate in a service program akin to national service, without enlisting in the Israeli Defense Forces. The program usually consists of three weeks of volunteer service on different rear army or air force bases, doing non-combative work. The program also has one and two week service periods. In the case of non-Israelis, they must be aged 17 years or older (or 15 if accompanied by a parent), and in the case of Israeli citizens, they must be 30 years of age or older, and have for some reason or another not completed their national service requirement.

The association was founded in spring 1983 by Yehuda Meir Indor and Cantors. Aharon Davidi, an Israeli general, was invited to be the first director of the organisation. Most of the volunteers arrived in Israel as part of the organization from the United States and from France. Volunteers are employed in a few weeks the IDF workshops – usually related jobs in maintenance and Logistics. Many volunteers come from the US organized by a US-based non-profit organization Volunteers for Israel. Sar-El had 881 volunteers from the United States in 2015, although volunteers have come from over 60 countries.   Sar-El accepts both Jewish and non-Jewish supporters of Israel from the age of 17 upwards.

Goals 
Contribute to strengthening the continuity of the Jewish people.
Creating a cultural exchange between Jewry in the Diaspora, and Israel.
Partnership with the supporters of Israel around the world, in a spirit of mutual benefit.

In 1988, the association was awarded the Speaker's Prize.

References

External links 
 Sar-El Home page
 Sar-el Volunteers Tour the Negev Desert with KKL-JNF
 Sar-El Australia
 Taking volunteering to the next level

Non-profit organizations based in Israel
Israel Defense Forces